Vlerick is a surname. Notable people with the surname include:

André Vlerick (1919–1990), Belgian politician, businessman and academic
Philippe Vlerick (born 1955), Belgian businessman, nephew of André

See also
Vlerick Leuven Gent Management School, business school in Belgium